The Nupoid languages are a branch of Volta–Niger spoken in west-central Nigeria, particularly in southeastern Niger State and northern Kogi State. They include the Nupe and Ebira languages, each with about 4 million speakers. Most Nupoid languages have 3 level tones.

Languages
Roger Blench (2013: 4) classifies the Nupoid languages as follows.
Ebira–Gade: Ebira, Gade
Nupe–Ganagana
Ganagana language (Ganagana)
Nupe
Asu
core Nupe
Nupe cluster: Nupe (Nupe–Nupe-Tako), Dibo
Gupa cluster: Gupa-Abawa, Kakanda, Kami, Kupa

In addition, Koro Zuba is close to Dibo.

Names and locations
Below is a list of language names, populations, and locations from Blench (2019).

Reconstructions
The following Proto-Nupoid reconstructions are from Blench (2013).

Some Proto-Nupe-Gbari crop name reconstructions are (Blench 2013):

References

External links
Nupoid materials (Roger Blench)

 
Volta–Niger languages